Yuliya Timonova (born 12 June 1973) is a Russian retired volleyball player.

She was part of the Russia women's national volleyball team winning the European title at the 1991 Women's European Volleyball Championship, 1993 Women's European Volleyball Championship, and the 1994 FIVB Women's Volleyball World Championship
Timonova also participated at the 1996 Summer Olympics.
On club level she played with Uralochka Yekaterinburg.

Clubs
 Uralochka Yekaterinburg (1994)

References

External links

http://www.volleyball.org/russia/olympic_team96.html

1973 births
Living people
Russian women's volleyball players
Soviet women's volleyball players
Place of birth missing (living people)
Olympic volleyball players of Russia
Volleyball players at the 1996 Summer Olympics
Goodwill Games medalists in volleyball
Competitors at the 1994 Goodwill Games
20th-century Russian women
21st-century Russian women